Sakhnenko is a Ukrainian surname. Notable people with the surname include:

 Daniel Sakhnenko (1875–1930), Ukrainian filmmaker and director
 Vladimir Sakhnenko (1930–2008), Ukrainian-Russian painter

Ukrainian-language surnames